The GE Dash 8-32B (also classified as B32-8 or D8-32B by some railroad companies) is a 4-axle  diesel-electric locomotive built by GE Transportation Systems between 1984 and 1989.  It is part of the GE Dash 8 Series of freight locomotives.  

A total of 49 examples of the Dash 8-32B model were built for North American railroads. The model is a 12-cylinder version of the (16 cylinder) Dash 8-40B and is powered by GE's 7FDL engine.  The first units built for the Burlington Northern Railroad were labelled by GE as B32-8, while later units built for Norfolk Southern followed GE's practice after 1987 of spelling "Dash 8" in the model name.

The GE Dash 8-32BWH (or B32-8WH) is a variant built with Head End Power (HEP) and a wide cab for Amtrak service.

In 2013, Norfolk Southern donated B32-8 number 3563 to the Lake Shore Railway Historical Society of North East, Pennsylvania. Then, in May 2017, the Everett Railroad purchased Dash 8-32B number 561 (formerly 3561) from Norfolk Southern. This unit would later be sold to NIWX in late 2020-early 2021. As of 2022, the Western Maryland Scenic Railroad also operates a B32-8, numbered 558.

As of June 2016, all units (except those that have since been sold off) still on the roster are pending disposition.

Original owners

See also
List of GE locomotives

References 

 
 
 

Dash 8-32B
B-B locomotives
Diesel-electric locomotives of the United States
Railway locomotives introduced in 1984
Freight locomotives
Standard gauge locomotives of the United States